George Berthold Samuelson (6 July 1889 – 17 April 1947) was a director and film producer.

Born in Southport, Lancashire, Samuelson was the youngest son of Henschel and Bertha Samuelson, tobacconists originally from Prussia. By 1891, his mother was widowed and was carrying on the business.

Samuelson had an extensive film career and was the creator of Southall Studios, one of the earliest film production companies in the United Kingdom. He also ran G. B. Samuelson Productions from 1914 to 1933.

He was the brother of Julian and Lauri Wylie and the father of Sir Sydney Samuelson.

Selected filmography
Producer
 Sixty Years a Queen (1913)
 A Study in Scarlet (1914)
 John Halifax, Gentleman (1915)
 The Valley of Fear (1916)
 Little Women (1917)
 The Elder Miss Blossom (1918)
 Linked by Fate (1919)
 Edge O' Beyond (1919)
 Damaged Goods (1919)
 The Pride of the Fancy (1920)
 The Last Rose of Summer (1920)
 Nance (1920)
 Her Story (1920)
 The Grip of Iron (1920)
 A Temporary Gentleman (1920)
 The Husband Hunter (1920)
 The Night Riders (1920)
David and Jonathan (1920)
 Love in the Wilderness (1920)
 The Ugly Duckling (1920)
 Mr. Pim Passes By (1921)
 For Her Father's Sake (1921)
 The Magistrate (1921)
 Stable Companions (1922)
 A Couple of Down and Outs (1923)
 Married Love (1923)
 The Knockout (1923)
 A Royal Divorce (1923)
 The Cost of Beauty (1924)
 The Unwanted (1924)

Director
 The Admirable Crichton (1918)
 The Bridal Chair (1919)
 Convict 99 (1919)
 The Game of Life (1922)
 Afterglow (1923)
 A Royal Divorce (1923)
 I Pagliacci (1923)
 Who Is the Man? (1924)
 She (1925)
 Motherland (1927)
 Two Little Drummer Boys (1928)
 The Forger (1928)
 For Valour (1928)
 Valley of the Ghosts (1928)
 Spanish Eyes (1930)
 The Wickham Mystery (1931)
 The Other Woman (1931)
 Collision (1932)
Threads (1932)
 The Callbox Mystery  (1932)
 The Crucifix (1934)

References

External links

 Gabriel A. Sivan: George Berthold Samuelson (1889-1947): Britain's Jewish film pioneer in Jewish Historical Studies, vol. 44 (2012) pp. 201–229</ref>

1889 births
1947 deaths
People from Southport
English film producers
G.B.
20th-century English businesspeople